Oxbow is an American experimental rock band from San Francisco, California. Founded in 1988, the band has released seven studio albums.

History
Oxbow began as a recording project. In 1988 bandmates Eugene Robinson (vocals, lyrics) and Niko Wenner (guitar, bass, keyboards, music) wrote songs with an approach decidedly different from their band at the time Whipping Boy. Wenner concocted an underlying musical architecture for his abrasive-then-plangent music, through use of arch form and musical palindromes unusual in the noise music genre the band was often placed. This organizing structure later grew to encompass the second Oxbow recording as well, and drew relationships between the two.  For his part Robinson changed his vocal approach to include in-the-studio improvisations and extensive vocal multi-tracking. This first record, titled Fuckfest has drumming split evenly between Greg Davis and Tom Dobrov. Dan Adams (bass in Oxbow, drums in Whipping Boy) joined immediately on completion of the first recording. All but Davis and Dobrov were at various times members of Whipping Boy, Wenner and Dobrov had been bandmates in the hardcore band Grim Reality Dobrov departed amicably after the band's 1995 European tour, but performed as guest second-drummer, with Davis, for the studio recording of "Shine (Glimmer)" on the 2002 album An Evil Heat.

The first album from Oxbow, Fuckfest, was released in 1989. It was described as "one of the most unique first statements in modern avant-rock" by Rock-A-Rolla magazine, "staggeringly eclectic" by Simon Reynolds, and "a fierce, rigorous album that challenges almost every preconception rock listeners might have" by Allmusic. Fuckfest was followed by King of the Jews (1991) and then by two Steve Albini-recorded albums: Let Me Be a Woman (1995) and Serenade in Red (1996–97), the latter featuring guest vocals from Marianne Faithfull. An Evil Heat followed in 2002 on Neurosis' Neurot Recordings label. Oxbow's 2007 album The Narcotic Story was named the number one album in the "Best of 2007" by Rock-A-Rolla magazine, and was listed with three other bands' albums in the nomination of Joe Chiccarelli as 'Producer of the Year' at the 50th Grammy Awards.

In May 2017 Oxbow released Thin Black Duke their seventh full-length album, like The Narcotic Story produced by Joe Chiccarelli and Niko Wenner and again on Hydra Head Records, to critical acclaim.

Musical style
Oxbow's material is musically varied and has been compared both to bands such as Neurosis and The Birthday Party, and modern classical composers such as Penderecki and John Luther Adams. Elements of blues, noise rock, heavy metal, jazz, and contemporary classical music are consistently mentioned. Allmusic writer Jason Ankeny identified elements of free jazz and musique concrète.

Members

Current line-up
Dan Adams - bass guitar, keyboards
Greg Davis - drums, percussion
Eugene S. Robinson - vocals, lyrics
Niko Wenner - guitars, keyboards, music

Dan Adams: Bass Guitar

Dan Adams, multi-instrumentalist, engineer who worked on animatronics in films such as Free Willie and Anaconda, and award-winning jazz drummer also used to drum for North Carolina's hardcore punk band the Ugly Americans.

Niko Wenner: Guitars, Keyboards

Oxbow composer, arranger, and producer Wenner "a master of sculpting noise and tone" has also toured and recorded as part of the bands God, Swell, Celan, and Jellyfish.

Wenner has engineered recordings for Oxbow and others, composed and performed music for contemporary dance, and appeared performing in an Academy Award nominee for best short film.

Eugene S. Robinson: Vocals

On Fuckfest "Robinson howls in a high-pitched, anguished voice somewhere between Robert Plant and Birthday Party-era Nick Cave", although his lyrics sound incomprehensible.

Robinson has provided guest vocals for several bands, including Soothsayer, Xiu Xiu, Black Sun,  Old Man Gloom, DJ /Rupture, Ultraphallus, Dead Kennedys, and his notable side project Bunuel, among others.

Vocalist Robinson, also an amateur fighter and a black belt in Brazilian Jiu Jitsu under Leopoldo Serao, has on several occasions dealt with misbehaving audience members with physical force.  He is also known for shedding his clothes on stage. Robinson is the author of the books "Paternostra", "Les sons inimitables de l'amour: un plan à trois en quatre actes", A Long Slow Screw and Fight: Everything You Ever Wanted to Know About Ass-Kicking but Were Afraid You'd Get Your Ass Kicked for Asking, and worked as an Editor-at-Large at OZY OZY.com, in addition to being a video host of the now-defunct Knuckle Up and his own The Eugene S. Robinson Show Stomper, as well as The Care/Don't Care Preview on Bloody Elbow and a regular contributor to Vice magazine all while publishing Look What You Made Me Do, his personal substack. He has also had his written work appear in the Los Angeles Times, GQ, the New York Times, the LA Weekly, Ad Age, The Quietus, PC Gamer, Hustler, Code, Revolver, Decibel and The Wire, among others. His infrequent film and television work has also seen him appearing in Leonard Part 6 with Bill Cosby, NBC's Midnight Caller, ABC's King of Love, MTV's Liquid Television's Las Apassionadas, and commercials most notably one directed by Gus Van Sant for Miller Genuine Draft, along with winning an Online Journalism Award for Online Commentary, Small Newsroom.

Discography

Albums

EPs

Compilations

Live albums

Splits

Music videos

DVDs

DVD included in the CD/DVD compilation Love That's Last: A Wholly Hypnographic and Disturbing Work Regarding Oxbow. There are six selections included on the DVD:
Music For Adults (documentary film)
Music For Adults (outtakes)
Oxbow live in Diksmuide, Belgium, Muziekclub 4AD May 19, 2002
Oxbow live in San Francisco, USA, Great American Music Hall November 14, 2004
SbarX (video + 5.1 audio mix)
The Snake &... (5.1 audio mix)

DVD based on Oxbow's 2009 European tour. Contains three selections:
"The Luxury of Empire" by Mariexxme (documentary film)
"Still Before" by Manuel Liebeskind (documentary film)
Oxbow live in Paris, France, La Maroquinerie November 8, 2009

16mm film, multi-camera, three selections are performed live, one selection is performed to the studio recording. There are 4 selections included on the DVD:
The Snake...
She's a Find
Ecce Homo
Bomb

References

External links
 
 [ Allmusic]

Noisecore musical groups
Musical groups from San Francisco
Musical groups established in 1989
American experimental musical groups
American experimental rock groups
American noise rock music groups